Acacia jensenii is a shrub or tree belonging to the genus Acacia and the subgenus Phyllodineae that is endemic to north western Australia.

Description
It produces yellow flowers from May to August.

Taxonomy
Acacia jensenii is closely related to Acacia dictyophleba and Acacia sabulosa. It was first formally described by Joseph Maiden in 1917 as a part of Alfred James Ewart and Olive Blanche Davies's work Appendix IV: Acacias of the Northern Territory. The Flora of the Northern Territory. It was reclassified as Racosperma jensenii in 2003 by Leslie Pedley and transferred back into genus Acacia in 2006. The only other synonym is Acacia jenseni.

Distribution
It has a scattered distribution in the Kimberley, Pilbara and Goldfields-Esperance regions of Western Australia where it is found on plains and sand dunes growing in red sandy soils and in sandstone gullies. It is also found in the Northern Territory in the Tanami Desert where it is situated on the slopes and crests of sand dunes.

See also
List of Acacia species

References

jensenii
Acacias of Western Australia
Flora of the Northern Territory
Plants described in 1917
Taxa named by Joseph Maiden